Wayne County is a county located in the southeastern part of the U.S. state of Georgia.  As of the 2020 census, the population was 30,144. The county seat is Jesup.

Wayne County comprises the Jesup, Georgia Micropolitan Statistical Area.

History

At the time of European contact, the area of what would become Wayne County was settled by the Guale people. Being close to the coast and bordered by the Altamaha River, Wayne County's history includes occupation by Spanish missionaries at the time of the settlement of Saint Augustine as well as short-lived French occupation. The flags of France, Spain, England, and the Confederate States of America all flew over Wayne.

Early years
Seventy years after General James Oglethorpe settled the colony of Georgia and 27 years after that colony became one of the 13 original states, Wayne County came into being. The county was named for Mad Anthony Wayne whose military career had made him a well-known hero.  When he surprised the British garrison at Stony Point on July 15, 1779, he acquired the nickname "Mad" Anthony.  From one siege to another, he was a vital member of General George Washington's staff serving well under General Nathanael Greene and coming to Georgia in 1781 in his service during the American Revolution.

It was created by an Act of the Legislature in 1803 after the Wilkinson Treaty was signed with the Creek Indians on January 16, 1802, which ceded part of the Tallassee Country and part of the lands within the forks of the Oconee and Ocmulgee Rivers to the United States. All counties organized prior to 1802 were headright counties – no surveys were ever made of those counties. It was found that under the headright system more land was given away than actually existed and this was the case for Wayne County. Although created in 1803, no valid lottery was done for the county until the Land Lottery Act of 1805. The 1805 Act divided the half million acres (2,000 km2) of Wayne County, formed the Tallassee Strip, and set the stage for the land lottery that would result in more formal settlement of the area. It is the second date, December 7, 1805, that the county chose to observe as the creation date. The area was not a popular one for lottery draws as the straws were drawn sight unseen and the winner was as likely to draw swampland as he was prime agricultural lots.

The fight for the county seat
The county was slow in developing and those in the area were in no hurry to be concerned with matters governmental.
On December 8, 1806, the Georgia General Assembly created appointed five commissioners to establish a permanent site for a county seat and called for county court to be held at the home of one those commissioners, Roberta Smallwood, until a permanent site could be established. In December 1808, the General Assembly called for a new set of commissioners to select a county seat, as the site picked by the previous set had picked a site near the upper corner of the county and was not centrally located. Court was to be held at the house of a Captain William Clements until a site was selected.

In December 1823, the General Assembly appointed another board of commissioners to establish a county seat.

The first post office in Wayne County was established at Tuckersville, sometimes seen as Tuckerville, on January 29, 1814. Tuckersville acted as the county seat until Waynesville was so designated.  John Tucker was the first postmaster and his service was followed by William A. Knight and Robert Stafford Jr. before the mail service was discontinued in 1827.  Tuckersville disappears from most maps by 1850. Its exact location remains a mystery although it is known it was 9 miles north of Waynesville on the Post Road near the ford of Buffalo Swamp. The intersection of Mount Pleasant Road and 10 Mile Road is a possible location.

It was not until December 1829, that legislative action created a county seat.  Wayne County's first official county seat was Waynesville, Georgia then considered to be a central location in the long and narrow county for settlers to travel for court and other primary government functions.  Waynesville was the site of Wayne County's first school, which was called Mineral Springs Academy.  It was named for the famous mineral springs which were a short distance east of the residential section of the town.

In December 1832, a petition of voters from Wayne County caused the General Assembly to call for the election of another board of commissioners to establish a centrally located county seat.

In the early 1840s, Waynesville was still being used as the county seat. In December 1847, the General Assembly called for another set of commissioners to select a county seat near the home of William Flowers near the ford of the Buffalo Swamp. The law also called for county court to be held at the courthouse then in existence near the residence of James Rawlinson.

In January 1856, the General Assembly called for a vote to be held in Wayne County about the removal of the county seat and to where it should be removed.

A new county seat
Although there is some doubt about whom the City of Jesup is named for, there is no doubt it became Jesup on October 24, 1870.  At the time Jesup was part of Appling County. Ambling along as Station Number 6 on the Atlantic and Gulf Railroad, the town grew into a city primarily due to the efforts of its first mayor, Willis Clary.  Clary had first moved to Wayne County in 1868 and was elected mayor shortly after moving into the town at a meeting held December 3, 1870.  Clary is credited with convincing the Macon and Brunswick Railroad to locate its tracks so that they crossed the Atlantic and Gulf rails at Jesup.  On August 27, 1872, eastern sections of Appling land districts 3 and 4 were added to Wayne County. From its beginning, Jesup has been a railway town and as early as 1891, the town's population was essentially connected to the railroads in some way.

In February 1873, the Georgia General Assembly called for a vote to be held in Wayne County to be held about removing the county seat. The voters were to be given the choice of "No removal", "Removal, Jesup", "Removal, Waynesville", and "Removal, Screven." Jesup was selected as the new county seat.

Screven and Odum
Although not formally incorporated until 1907, the cities of Screven and Odum are also historic railroad towns. Screven ranks as the oldest established town being formally established in 1854 when the town became a terminus on the Atlantic and Gulf Railroad. The rail line connected Screven and Thomasville which at the time was a resort city popular with Europeans and wealthy Americans. It is not known exactly when Station Number 7 became known as Screven but the town bears the name of the family of Dr. James Proctor Screven and his son, John Bryan Screven of Savannah who were operating the railroad at the time of its inception. Screven's first businessman and landowner, C. C. Grace helped to build the community. Likewise, Godfrey Odum used real estate to build his fortune and to improve the community into a town. Odum became a stop on the Macon and Brunswick Railroad and later became a part of the East Tennessee, Virginia, and Georgia.  Odum was known as Satilla on an 1870 timetable from the Macon and Brunswick and before that it was known as Haslum. Rail access made it easier for Odum's turpentine and sawmills products to be shipped to larger markets.

Naval stores
Henry W. Grady once said South Georgia was only suited for pine trees and cows and it is the pine that has made Wayne County the pine tree infested place it is. Others have said, "You can always tell someone from Wayne County, but not much." Through the years, turpentine and naval stores made communities, schools and churches spring up along the paths of the railroads and the streams and creeks. Places like Mount Pleasant, Gardi, McKinnon, Doctortown, Manningtown, Brentwood, Ritch, O'Quinn, Madray Springs and Piney Grove were centers of family life.

Geography

The northern and eastern two-thirds of Wayne County, from north of Odum to south and east of Screven, is located in the Altamaha River sub-basin of the basin by the same name. The entire western edge of the county is located in the Little Satilla River sub-basin of the St. Marys River-Satilla River basin. A small southern portion of Wayne County, north and east of Hortense, is located in the Satilla River sub-basin of the St. Marys River-Satilla River basin, with the adjacent southeastern portion of the county located in the Cumberland-St. Simons sub-basin of the same St. Marys River-Satilla River basin.

Major highways

  U.S. Route 25
  U.S. Route 84
  U.S. Route 301
  U.S. Route 341
  State Route 23
  State Route 27
  State Route 38
  State Route 169
  State Route 203

Adjacent counties
 Tattnall County (north)
 Long County (northeast)
 McIntosh County (east)
 Glynn County (southeast)
 Brantley County (south)
 Pierce County (southwest)
 Appling County (northwest)

Demographics

2000 census
As of the census of 2000, there were 26,565 people, 9,324 households, and 6,937 families residing in the county.  The population density was 41 people per square mile (16/km2).  There were 10,827 housing units at an average density of 17 per square mile (6/km2).  The racial makeup of the county was 76.7% White, 20.3% Black or African American, 0.2% Native American, 0.4% Asian, <0.1% Pacific Islander, 1.3% from other races, and 1.0% from two or more races.  3.8% of the population were Hispanic or Latino of any race.

There were 9,324 households, out of which 35.9% had children under the age of 18 living with them, 56.5% were married couples living together, 14.0% had a female householder with no husband present, and 25.6% were non-families. 22.6% of all households were made up of individuals, and 9.4% had someone living alone who was 65 years of age or older.  The average household size was 2.62 and the average family size was 3.06.

In the county, the population was spread out, with 25.9% under the age of 18, 8.6% from 18 to 24, 30.7% from 25 to 44, 23.4% from 45 to 64, and 11.4% who were 65 years of age or older.  The median age was 36 years. For every 100 females there were 108.4 males.  For every 100 females age 18 and over, there were 109.8 males.

The median income for a household in the county was $32,766, and the median income for a family was $39,442. Males had a median income of $31,977 versus $19,551 for females. The per capita income for the county was $15,628.  About 13.4% of families and 16.7% of the population were below the poverty line, including 22.7% of those under age 18 and 14.4% of those age 65 or over.

2010 census
As of the 2010 United States Census, there were 30,099 people, 10,562 households, and 7,686 families residing in the county. The racial makeup of the county was 74.9% white, 19.9% black or African American, 0.5% Asian, 0.4% American Indian, 2.2% from other races, and 2.0% from two or more races. Those of Hispanic or Latino origin made up 5.7% of the population. In terms of ancestry, 15.0% were American, 11.9% were Irish, 11.0% were English, and 5.6% were German.

Of the 10,562 households, 37.5% had children under the age of 18 living with them, 52.7% were married couples living together, 14.9% had a female householder with no husband present, 27.2% were non-families, and 23.6% of all households were made up of individuals. The average household size was 2.63 and the average family size was 3.09. The median age was 37.6 years.

The median income for a household in the county was $37,340 and the median income for a family was $45,649. Males had a median income of $40,167 versus $26,283 for females. The per capita income for the county was $18,393. About 13.2% of families and 18.3% of the population were below the poverty line, including 23.8% of those under age 18 and 14.5% of those age 65 or over.

2020 census

As of the 2020 United States census, there were 30,144 people, 10,400 households, and 7,166 families residing in the county. The median income for a household in the county was $45,773.

Education 

Wayne County School District operates public schools.

Government and infrastructure 
The Federal Bureau of Prisons operates the Federal Correctional Institution, Jesup in Jesup, Wayne County.

Politics
Prior to 1964, Wayne County voted in line with most counties in the Solid South and Georgia, consistently supporting Democratic presidential candidates. From 1964 on, the county has swung hard to the Republican Party in most presidential elections, with the only times they have failed to win the county since then being 1968 for segregationist George Wallace as well as 1976 and 1980 for Georgian Jimmy Carter. Non-Georgian Democrats have only managed 40 percent of the vote twice since then, in 1988 and 1992.

Communities

Cities
 Jesup (county seat)
 Screven

Town
 Odum

Unincorporated communities
 Brentwood
 Doctortown
 Gardi
 Madray Springs
 Manningtown

Former communities
 Dales Mill
 Fort Barrington
 Pendarvis
 Tuckersville
 Waynesville
 Williamsburg

Trivia
Wayne County is also home of one of the United States' few operational drive-in movie theaters, The Jesup Drive In, built in 1948 by Ward P. Riggins Sr. as a family drive-in theater, located on U.S. Highway 301 North in Wayne County.
 Anne Nichols (1891-1966), from Dales Mill, was an American playwright best known as the author of Abie's Irish Rose.
 David Larson from Jesup was a Gold Medalist Swimmer at the 1984 Summer Olympics in Los Angeles.
 Howard E. Wasdin is a Purple Heart and Silver Star Recipient for his actions and injuries sustained in the Battle of Mogadishu in Mogadishu, Somalia.  He is a former sniper in the Naval Special Warfare Development Group (DEVGRU).

See also

 National Register of Historic Places listings in Wayne County, Georgia
List of counties in Georgia

References 
 Jordan, Margaret Coleman. Wayne miscellany. [s.l.] : Jordan, c1976. viii, 253 p. : ill. ; 29 cm. Cover title: Misogyny of Wayne County.

 
Georgia (U.S. state) counties
1803 establishments in Georgia (U.S. state)
Populated places established in 1803